Chitrakatha (Hindi: चित्रकथा, Telugu: చిత్రకథ, Malayalam: ചിത്രകഥ), Tamil: சித்திரக்கதை) are comics or graphic novels originating from India published in a number of Indian languages.

India has a long tradition of comic readership and themes associated with extensive mythologies and folk-tales have appeared as children's comic books for decades. Indian comics often have large publication. The comic industry was at its peak in the late 1980s and early 1990s and during this period popular comics were easily sold more than 500,000 copies over the course of its shelf life of several weeks. Currently, it only sell around 50,000 copies over a similar period. India's once-flourishing comic industry is in sharp decline because of increasing competition from satellite television (children's television channels) and the gaming industry.

Over the last 6 decades Diamond Comics, Raj Comics, Tinkle, Balarama and Amar Chitra Katha have established vast distribution networks countrywide and are read by hundreds of thousands of children in a wide range of languages. Famous comic creators from India include Pratap Mulick, Chandu, Harvinder Mannkar, Sukhwant Kalsi, Anupam Sinha, Aabid Surti, Uncle Pai and cartoonist Pran Kumar Sharma, Neerad and famous characters are Chacha Chaudhary, Bahadur, Meeku, Motu Patlu, Detective Moochhwala, Nagraj, Super Commando Dhruva, Doga, Suppandi and Shikari Shambu and many more .
 Anant Pai, affectionately known as "Uncle Pai," is credited with helping to launch India's comic book industry in the 1960s with his "Amar Chitra Katha" series chronicling the ancient Hindu mythologies.

History 
India's comic industry began in the mid-1960s when the leading newspaper The Times of India launched Indrajal Comics. The industry evolved later in India. Up until the late 1960s the comics were only enjoyed by the children of wealthy parents. But from that time until the early 1990s they established themselves in the market. The evolution of Indian comics can be broadly divided into many phases. Around 1950s saw syndicated strips like The Phantom, Mandrake, Flash Gordon, Rip Kirby being translated to Indian languages. The success of such comic books was followed by a swarm of publishers trying to emulate these titles. The second phase in the late 1960s came in the form of Amar Chitra Katha (literally translated as "immortal picture stories"), comics with hundred percentage Indian content.

In the 1970s several indigenous comics were launched to rival the Western superhero comics. The superhero comics in the early '80s marked the third wave, with creators and publishers hoping to benefit from the success of the superhero genre in the West. However, one of India's earliest superheroes is Batul the Great, was created during the 1960s by Narayan Debnath., whose early comic strip Handa Bhonda, inspired by Laurel and Hardy, had been launched in the magazine Shuktara in 1962. In the 1980s, at least 5.5 million copies of comics such as Heroes of Faith series were sold in India. Dozens of publishers churned out hundreds of such comic books every month, but this trend nosedived in the late '90s with the advent of cable television, Internet and other modes of entertainment in India. However, publishers like Raj Comics and Diamond Comics along with comics like Amar Chitra Katha (with characters such as Suppandi) have been able to sustain their readership. After a lull, new publishing companies such as Level 10 Comics, Chariot Comics, Arkin Comics, Nila Comics,  Yali Dream Creations, Fiction Comics, Comix Theory, Green Gold, Jr. Diamond, diamond books, diamond toons etc. have appeared on the market in the last few years. Comic publishers meanwhile have been accused by critics of lacking innovation in the face of digital competition. But counter to the claims many innovations had been introduced where Indian publishers have tried many innovative ways to promote comics such as animation, film and short films, and TV serials and ecomics, VHS films, audio films and mobile apps by Raj Comics, Diamond Comics, Amar Chitra Katha. And a very innovatively attempt was done by Indian publishers which is reaching out to 236 Indian Rajya Sabha members through sending postcards with request to promote reading books and comics by world record holder sri Niand Jadhav ji in conjunction with Indian comics publishers Comix Theory and Comics Byte, and also comics art workshops, massive comics giveaways programs, Pulp Gulp Talk Show made by Comix Theory to promote comics digitally and brings out various topics of discourse in mainstream comics which were earlier not present like comics and philosophy, history of comics directly from the academicians, link between comics and fine art and theatre from the viewpoints of legendary as well as new comics artist of Indian comics industry, making a rich contribution to the present culture and discourse on Indian comics from within. A dedicated news portal  Comics Byte has been seen covering Indian comics and its activities. Recently vr and ar enabled comics were seen apart from the long exploited 3d comics of past, TBS Planet comics devised vr comics where one can discover a hidden treasure box called 'treasure hunt" through the help of their smart phone pointing at the pages of comics, another example is from Kolkata Comics who made AR capable comics to translate comics from bangle language to English language on smart phone screen  all these innovations, innovative activities makes recent years in Indian comics most dynamic and addressing the issues developed historically in Indian comics industry.

Webcomics have been a popular medium in India since the early 2000s. Indian webcomics are successful as they reach a large audience for free and they are frequently used by the country's younger generation to spread social awareness on topics such as politics and feminism. These webcomics reach a large amount of exposure by being spread through social media. Also there were publishers solely dedicated to bringing licensed content to Indian comics market. Gotham Comics was such an example around 1997 to 2008. Gotham Comics made possible Spiderman India a version of western iconic character Spiderman. Dolton comics, courtesy to Chandamama had many DC characters published in India in various languages mainly superman and batman were staple products. publication of licensed characters in by Indian comics publishers has a long history which includes publishers like Amar Chitra Katha, Madhumuskan, Gowersons, lion comics, Egmont, euro kids and recent years regal comics, Fenil comics, Shakti comics and many more.

India hosted its first ever comics convention in February 2011. According to 2012 estimates, the Indian comic publishing industry was worth over 100 million dollars.

Diamond Comics, Manoj Comics , Raj Comics,Diamond Toons , Tulsi Comics  have gained immense readership and fan following in north India from 1980's because of their popular characters like Chacha Chaudhary, Billoo, Pinki, Nagraj, Super Commando Dhruva, Hawaldar Bahadur, Angara, Jamboo and many more. Creators like Anant Pai, Abid Surti, Pran, Pratap Mullick, Enver Ahmed, Anupam Sinha, Manu, Ved Prakash Sharma, Parshuram Sharma, and many more are well known in north Indian comics due to their creations of various comics characters and volumes of works produced during their active period.

The popularity of manga and anime in India has led to Japanese manga-inspired comic books, such as Mythology, a comic book based on Hindu mythology that has been released in India, Singapore, Malaysia and Europe. Batu Gaiden is a manga fantasy series which incorporates cricket into mythology.

From 2005 to recent times there are many attempts by recently ventured and old comics publishers to revive the Indian comics industry including initiatives from Level 10 Comics, Yali Dream Creations, Holycow Entertainment, Chariot Comics, Ayumi Comics, Red Streak Comics, Rovolt Comics, Vimanika Comics and TBS Planet Comics, UFC, Dream Comics, Swapnil Comics, Vaishnavi Comics, Fenil Comics, Dhaansu Productions and the surviving Raj Comics itself. Amar Chitra Katha, Raj Comics and Diamond Comics, Diamond Toons has ventured into other entertainment media like feature films, web series, games, mobile applications etc. since late 1990s and continuously attempting to widen their impact on the comics-reading population. By the end of 2019, many new comic-making companies have shown a great interest in the upbringing of the Indian comic industry and are fighting to make a mark in the industry.

Indian comics publishers 

Diamond Toons
Amar Chitra Katha
Balabhumi
Balarama (magazine)
Diamond Books
Champak
Chandamama
Chitra Bharti Kathamala
Diamond Comics
Indrajal Comics
King Comics
Kiran Comics
Lalu Leela
Level 10 Comics
Lion Comics
Lotpot
Madhu Muskan
Manoj Comics
Radha Comics
Radiant Comics
Raj Comics
Shakti Comics
Star Comics IBH
TBS Planet
Tinkle
Tulsi Comics
Vimanika Comics
Yali Dream Creations
Yomics World

Notable creators 

Abid Surti
Anant Pai 
Anupam Sinha 
Dheeraj Verma
Manoj Gupta
Narayan Debnath
Pran Kumar Sharma
Pratap Mullick

Annual events 
 Comic Con India
 Comics Fest India 
 New Delhi World Book Fair

See also 
 Indian Comics: Medium, History, Genre by Pia Mukherji, IWE Online, 5 April 2022.

 Magazine
 Media of India

Lists
 List of Indian comics
 List of newspapers in India
 List of radio stations in India
 List of Indian TV channels
 List of Indian films

References

Bibliography
 Dastidar, D. Ghosh. “Prospects of Comic Studies in India,” Gnosis 3 (2019), 113–128.
 Hawley, John Stratton. 'The Saints Subdued: Domestic Virtue and National Integration in Amar Chitra Katha' in Media and the Transformation of Religion in South Asia, eds. Lawrence A Babb, Susan S. Wadley, Motilal Banarasidas, 1998.
 MacLain, Karline. India's Immortal Comic Books: Gods, Kings, and Other Heroes, Indiana University Press, 2009. .
 Pritchett, Frances W. 'The World of Amar Chitra Katha' in Media and the Transformation of Religion in South Asia, eds. Lawrence A Babb, Susan S. Wadley, Motilal Banarasidas, 1998.
 Lent, John A., Comic Art of Africa, Asia, Australia, and Latin America Through 2000: An International Bibliography, Greenwood Publishing Group, 2004.

External links 
 GraphicShelf - India's first Graphic Novel Database
 CulturePOPcorn – Indian Comics and POP Culture News Channel

 
Indian comics artists
Indian literature